Chicomurex superbus, common name : superb murex, is a species of sea snail, a marine gastropod mollusk in the family Muricidae, the murex snails or rock snails.

Description
The shell size varies between 40 mm and 85 mm with the average size being 62 mm

Distribution
This species is found amongst seamounts and knolls in the Mascarene Basin, along North Queensland and Japan.

References

 Merle D., Garrigues B. & Pointier J.-P. (2011) Fossil and Recent Muricidae of the world. Part Muricinae. Hackenheim: Conchbooks. 648 pp. page(s): 110

External links
 

Muricidae
Gastropods described in 1889